The following lists events that happened during the 1640s in South Africa.

Events
 1643 - The Portuguese ship, Santa Maria Madre de Deus is wrecked off the South African east coast 
 1647 - The Portuguese ship, Sacromento is wrecked off the South African east coast near Port Edward. Another Portuguese ship Nossa Serihora da Atalayais also lost off Keiskamma Point near between East London and Port Elizabeth
 25 March 1647 - The Dutch ship, Nieuwe Haerlem is wrecked in Table Bay and survivors later build a small fort

References
See Years in South Africa for list of References

History of South Africa